Pacificibacter marinus is a Gram-negative and non-motile bacterium from the genus of Pacificibacter has been isolated from seawater from the Yellow Sea at Hwang-do in Korea.

References 

Rhodobacteraceae
Bacteria described in 2011